The 1986 NCAA Division I Women's Lacrosse Championship was the fifth annual single-elimination tournament to determine the national championship for Division I National Collegiate Athletic Association (NCAA) women's college lacrosse. The championship game was played at Byrd Stadium in College Park, Maryland during May 1986.

The Maryland Terrapins won their first championship after defeating the Penn State Nittany Lions in the final, 11–10.

For the second consecutive year, the leading scorer for the tournament was Anysia Fedec, from Maryland, with 13 goals. The Most Outstanding Player trophy was not awarded this year.

Qualification
All NCAA Division I women's lacrosse programs were eligible for this championship. In the end, 6 teams contested this tournament, an increase of two from the previous year.

Tournament bracket

Tournament outstanding players 
Anysia Fedec, Maryland
Trudy Stumpf, Maryland
Maggy Dunphy, Penn State

See also 
 NCAA Division I Women's Lacrosse Championship
 NCAA Division III Women's Lacrosse Championship
 1986 NCAA Division I Men's Lacrosse Championship

References

NCAA Division I Women's Lacrosse Championship
NCAA Division I Women's Lacrosse Championship
NCAA Women's Lacrosse Championship